Francis Dyer Rich (1828 – 5 December 1901) was a 19th-century Member of the New Zealand Parliament for Otago, New Zealand.

He stood unsuccessfully for the electorate in 

He was an early settler in Auckland, then moving to Canterbury. He died at his family home Woodstock, Orariore near Cambridge and the Piako Swamp in the Waikato.

References

1828 births
1901 deaths
Members of the New Zealand House of Representatives
New Zealand MPs for Dunedin electorates
19th-century New Zealand politicians
New Zealand farmers